Composite bundles  play a prominent role in gauge theory with symmetry breaking, e.g., gauge gravitation theory, non-autonomous mechanics where  is the time axis, e.g., mechanics with time-dependent parameters, and so on.

Composite bundle

In differential geometry by a composite bundle is meant the composition

 

of fiber bundles

 

It is provided with bundle coordinates , where  are bundle coordinates on a fiber bundle , i.e., transition functions of coordinates  are independent of coordinates .

The following fact provides the above mentioned physical applications of composite bundles. Given the composite bundle (1), let  be a global section
of a fiber bundle , if any. Then the pullback bundle 

Composite principal bundle 

For instance, let  be a principal bundle with a structure Lie group  which is reducible to its closed subgroup .

Jet manifolds of a composite bundle

There is the canonical map

 .

Composite connection

These connections are given by the corresponding tangent-valued connection forms

 

 

 

A connection  on a fiber bundle 
and a connection   on a fiber bundle  define a connection

 

on a composite bundle . It is called the composite connection.

Vertical covariant differential

Given the composite bundle  (1), there is the following exact sequence of vector bundles over :

 

Every connection  on a fiber bundle  yields the splitting

 

of the exact sequence (2). Using this splitting, one can construct a first order differential operator

 

on a composite bundle . It is called the vertical covariant differential.
It possesses the following important property.

Every connection  induces the pullback connection

 

Then the restriction of a vertical covariant differential   to  coincides with the familiar covariant differential 
on  relative to the pullback connection .

References
 Saunders, D., The geometry of jet bundles. Cambridge University Press, 1989. .
 Mangiarotti, L., Sardanashvily, G., Connections in Classical and Quantum Field Theory. World Scientific, 2000. .

External links
Sardanashvily, G., Advanced Differential Geometry for Theoreticians. Fiber bundles, jet manifolds and Lagrangian theory, Lambert Academic Publishing, 2013. ;

See also
Connection (mathematics)
Connection (fibred manifold)

Differential geometry
Connection (mathematics)